Nyctimystes lubisi, or Lubis's tree frog, is a frog endemic to Indonesia.  Scientists know it exclusively from its type locality in Papua Province.

References

Endemic fauna of Indonesia
Frogs of Asia
lubisi